The 2006 Teen Choice Awards ceremony was held on August 20, 2006, at the Gibson Amphitheatre, Universal City, California. The event was hosted by Dane Cook and Jessica Simpson, with Nelly Furtado & Timbaland, Rihanna, and Kevin Federline as performers. Fall Out Boy was the most-awarded music act of the night, having won three awards.

Performers
Nelly Furtado and Timbaland – "Promiscuous"
Rihanna – "SOS"
Kevin Federline – closed the show with the television debut of his single "Lose Control"

Presenters

Paula Abdul
Jensen Ackles
Jessica Alba
Mischa Barton
Kristen Bell
Rachel Bilson
David Boreanaz
Chris "Ludacris" Bridges
Hilarie Burton
Sophia Bush and Chingy – presented Choice Love Song
Kristin Cavallari
Emily Deschanel
Jenna Dewan
Carmen Electra and David Spade – presented Choice Comedian
JoJo
Ashton Kutcher – presented the Courage Award to Jason McElwain
Christina Milian
Wentworth Miller
Brittany Murphy
Chad Michael Murray
Ne-Yo
Amaury Nolasco
Ashley Olsen and Snoop Dogg – presented Choice Action Adventure Movie
Jared Padalecki
Sean Paul
Jaime Pressly
Brandon Routh
Dax Shepard
Britney Spears – introduced Kevin Ferderline
Wilmer Valderrama
Marlon Wayans
Tom Welling
Shaun White

Winners and nominees
Voting took place via the Teen People, MySpace, IGN and Fox websites and ended on August 11, 2006.

Winners are listed first and highlighted in bold.

Movies

Television

Music

Sports

Miscellaneous

References

External links 
 

Teen Choice Awards
2006 awards
2006 in California
August 2006 events